Teijin Soccer Club was a Japanese football club based in Ehime. The club has played in Japan Soccer League Division 2.

Club name
1960–1977 : Teijin Matsuyama SC
1978–2002 : Teijin SC

External links
Football of Japan

Japan Soccer League clubs
1960 establishments in Japan
2002 disestablishments in Japan
Sports teams in Ehime Prefecture
Association football clubs established in 1960
Association football clubs disestablished in 2002
Works association football clubs in Japan